Tall buildings, such as skyscrapers, are intended here as enclosed structures with continuously occupiable floors and a height of at least . Such definition excludes non-building structures, such as towers.

History 

Historically, the world's tallest man-made structure was the Great Pyramid of Giza in Egypt, which held the position for over 3800 years until the construction of Lincoln Cathedral in 1311. The Strasbourg Cathedral in France, completed in 1439, was the world's tallest building until 1874.

The first skyscraper was pioneered in Chicago with the  Home Insurance Building in 1885. The United States would remain the location of the world's tallest building throughout the 20th century until 1998, when the Petronas Towers were completed. Since then, two other buildings have gained the title: Taipei 101 in 2004 and Burj Khalifa in 2010. Since the beginning of the 21st century, the Middle East, China, and Southeast Asia have experienced booms in skyscraper construction.

Ranking criteria and alternatives 
The international non-profit organization Council on Tall Buildings and Urban Habitat (CTBUH) was formed in 1969 and announces the title of "The World's Tallest Building" and sets the standards by which buildings are measured. It maintains a list of the 100 tallest completed buildings in the world. However, the CTBUH only recognizes buildings that are complete, and some buildings included within the lists in this article are not considered finished by the CTBUH.

In 1996, as a response to the dispute as to whether the Petronas Towers or the Sears Tower was taller, the council listed and ranked buildings in four categories:
 height to structural or architectural top;
 height to floor of highest occupied floor;
 height to top of roof (removed as category in November 2009); and
 height to top of any part of the building.
All categories measure the building from the level of the lowest significant open-air pedestrian entrance.

Spires are considered integral parts of the architectural design of buildings, changes to which would substantially change the appearance and design of the building, whereas antennas may be added or removed without such consequences. The Petronas Towers, with their spires, are thus ranked higher than the Willis Tower (formerly the Sears Tower) with its antennas, despite the Petronas Towers' lower roofs and lower highest point.

Until 1996, the world's tallest building was defined by the height to the top of the tallest architectural element, including spires but not antennae. In 1930, this definitional argument led to a rivalry between the Bank of Manhattan Building and the Chrysler Building.

The Burj Khalifa currently tops the list by some margin, regardless of which criterion is applied.

Tallest buildings in the world 

The building is considered as architecturally topped out when it is under construction, structurally topped out, fully clad, and the highest finished architectural elements are in place.

Of these buildings, almost half are in China. Six of the last seven buildings to have held the record as 'tallest building' are still found in the list, with the exception being the North Tower of the original World Trade Center at  after its destruction in the September 11 attacks of 2001. If the Twin Towers were never destroyed, and One World Trade Center was never built, the WTC towers would rank 35 and 36 on the list today.

Alternative measurements

Height to pinnacle (highest point) 

This measurement disregards distinctions between architectural and non-architectural extensions, and simply measures to the highest point, irrespective of material or function of the highest element.

This measurement is useful for air traffic obstacle determinations, and is also a wholly objective measure. However, this measurement includes extensions that are easily added, removed, and modified from a building and are independent of the overall structure.

This measurement only recently came into use, when the Petronas Towers passed the Sears Tower (now named Willis Tower) in height. The former was considered taller because its spires were considered architectural, while the latter's antennae were not. This led to the split of definitions, with the Sears Tower claiming the lead in this and the height-to-roof (now highest occupied floor) categories, and with the Petronas claiming the lead in the architectural height category.

If the World Trade Center towers were still standing, the North and South Towers would fall between numbers 35 and 36 on the current list (it can be assumed the rebuilt One World Trade Center would have never been built).

Height to occupied floor 

This height is measured to the highest occupiable floor within the building.

Buildings under construction 
This is a list of buildings taller than  that are currently under construction. On-hold buildings whose construction was interrupted after it had reached a significantly advanced state are also listed.

List by continent 
The following list shows the tallest completed buildings located on each continent listed by greatest to least height (click on name of continent for continent-specific list):

See also 

 List of tallest freestanding structures
 List of tallest towers
 History of the world's tallest buildings
 Skyscraper Index
 Vanity height

Notes

References

External links
 
 Council on Tall Buildings and Urban Habitat
 Emporis, international database and gallery of buildings
 Structurae, international database and gallery of structures

Lists of buildings and structures
 
Lists of construction records